Forres is a town and former royal burgh in the north of Scotland on the Moray coast, approximately  northeast of Inverness and  west of Elgin. Forres has been a winner of the Scotland in Bloom award on several occasions. There are many geographical and historical attractions nearby such as the River Findhorn, and there are also classical, historical artifacts and monuments within the town itself, such as Forres Tolbooth and Nelson's Tower.   Brodie Castle, the home of the Brodie Clan, lies to the west of the town, close to the A96.

A list of suburbs in the town of Forres contains: Brodie, Dalvey, Mundole and Springdale.

Pre-history and archaeology 
Between 2002 and 2013 some 70 hectares of land was investigated by archaeologists in advance of a proposed residential development on the southern fringes of the town. They found an extensive Iron Age settlement and evidence that people lived in the area from the Neolithic (radiocarbon dates from the 4th to the mid-3rd millennium BC were found) to the Early Historic period (they found radiocarbon dates from the 9th–12th centuries AD, around the time that historical records began). The Iron Age settlement had a souterrain and metalworking furnaces, and they found Neolithic and Bronze Age ceramics and cup-marked rock art. The excavation of a souterrain in Moray is quite rare; only one other souterrain had been excavated in Moray before this one.

History
The town is the location of Sueno's Stone, an enormous carved stone probably created by Picts to commemorate a battle against Norse invaders. Sueno's Stone translates to Sven's Stone. It dates from AD 850 to AD 950.

A royal castle was present in the area from at least 900 AD, and around 1140 AD Forres became a royal burgh. Royal burghs were founded by the Kings of Scots of the 12th century to encourage trade and economic improvement. The local abbey was plundered by the Wolf of Badenoch in 1390.

On 23 June 1496 King James IV of Scotland issued a Royal Charter laying down the rights and privileges that the town's people are believed to have held by an earlier charter since the reign of King David I some 300 years earlier.

Brodie Castle, which was commissioned by Brodie family in 1567, lies to the west of the town.

William Shakespeare's play Macbeth, first performed in 1606, locates Duncan's castle in Forres, and the Three Witches meet on moorland near the town in the third scene of the drama.

The Dallas Dhu distillery, established in 1898, lies just south of the town; although no longer producing, the distillery is maintained in working order by Historic Environment Scotland. Benromach Distillery, also established in 1898, is located just north of the Forres bypass and is an active distillery with a visitors' centre.

The Findhorn Foundation, an intentional community, was established in the town in the 1940s. The former RAF Forres, established during the Second World War, is located nearby.

In January 2016, Glasgow School of Art established a campus in the town which focuses on design and innovation.

Demography
The population of Forres expanded in the 20th century and was over 12,000 in 2011.

Geography and economy
Sitting between the floodplain of the River Findhorn and the wooded slopes of Cluny and Sanquhar Hills, Forres is well known for its award-winning floral sculptures. Local bars and pubs include The Newmarket, The Red Lion (known locally as "The Beastie") The Mosset Tavern, and The Carlton Hotel.

Parliamentary burgh

Forres was a parliamentary burgh, combined with Inverness, Fortrose and Nairn, in the Inverness Burghs constituency of the House of Commons of the Parliament of Great Britain from 1708 to 1801 and of the Parliament of the United Kingdom from 1801 to 1918. The constituency was abolished in 1918 and the Forres and Nairn components were merged into the then new constituency of Moray and Nairn. Forres Town Hall, originally built as a masonic hall and later used as a mechanics institute before becoming a municipal building, was completed in 1829.

Notable residents
 Frank Fraser Darling (1903 - 1979), an English ecologist, ornithologist, farmer, conservationist and author. He gives his name to the Fraser Darling effect.
 Hugh Falconer (1808–1865), Scottish geologist, botanist, palaeontologist, and paleoanthropologist
 John Gordon FRSE (1786–1818) anatomist born in Forres
 Sir Alexander Grant, 1st Baronet (1864 - 1937), a Scottish businessman, biscuit manufacturer and philanthropist, known as creator of Mcvities Digestive Biscuits.
 Charles Lumley (1824–1858), recipient of the Victoria Cross
 James McIntyre (1828-1906). Born in Forres, moved to Canada 1841, and to Ingersoll, 1854. Cabinetmaker and undertaker, proprietor of furniture factory and poet.
 James Scott (Liberal politician) (1876-1939), Scottish lawyer and Liberal party politician.
 Donald Smith, 1st Baron Strathcona and Mount Royal (1820–1914), Scottish-born Canadian businessman and philanthropist
 James Taylor (neurologist) (1859-1946), British neurologist who studied diseases of the nervous system.
 Roy Williamson (1936–1990), Scottish songwriter and folk musician, member of the Corries, who wrote "Flower of Scotland"

Climate
As with the rest of the British Isles and Scotland, Forres experiences a maritime climate with cool summers and mild winters. The lowest temperature to be recorded in recent years was  during December 2010.

Transport

Forres is situated on the A96 trunk route connecting the cities of Aberdeen and Inverness. The River Findhorn was originally crossed by fording near Waterford Farm. A suspension bridge was opened in 1831 to cross the river at the west end of the town. This bridge was replaced by the current bridge in 1938. Due to high volumes of traffic passing through the town centre, a bypass was built in the late 1980s to reduce congestion in the town centre. A new, dual carriageway A96 bypass is planned by the Scottish Government.

Forres railway station is situated just outside the town and is operated by ScotRail. The town of Forres was once a triangular junction in the Highland Railway network, travelling through Forres was once the quickest route to reach Inverness from the south. Originally the station had four platforms; two of which were on the north side of the triangle on the route between Inverness and Aberdeen, the third on the south west side of the triangle used by services to Grantown-on-Spey. The fourth was a short platform on the south east side used by through services between Elgin and Aviemore via Grantown. Trains from Grantown towards Nairn or Inverness had to run through the station and then reverse back into the Aberdeen to Inverness platform. The service to Grantown-on-Spey was closed in the 1960s and now forms part of The Dava Way, a scenic footpath connecting the two towns.

Education
Andersons Primary School, High Street (state primary school)
Forres Academy, Burdsyard Road (state secondary school)
Drumduan School (private school for 5–18-year-olds)

Religion 
A number of Christian churches have a presence in Forres, including:

Church of Scotland

 St Laurence Church, High Street
 St Leonard's Church, High Street

Scottish Episcopal Church

 St John's Church, Victoria Road

Roman Catholic Church

 St Margaret's Church, High Street

Baptist Union of Scotland

 Forres Baptist Church, Clovenside Road

Sport
Forres has various sporting activities within it including Forres Golf Course, which has held the Scottish Young Professionals championships a number of times.

Forres St. Lawrence is the local cricket club. They are full members in both senior and reserve competitions in the area.

Forres Harriers is the local running club with around 80 members. The most famous Harrier is Don Ritchie who at one time held 14 world best times for ultra distance running events ranging from 50 km to 200 km.

Forres has two swimming clubs - the long established Forres Bluefins, as well as the UK's only specialist sprint swimming club, Free Style SC.

Forres hosted the first race of the World Orienteering Championships 2015 on Friday 31 July, when the Sprint Qualification event was held there. Two days later on 2 August it hosted the Sprint Final event.

Town twinning
 Mount Dora, Florida 
 Vienenburg, Germany

References

External links
Forres Community Council  – official community council website
Forres-net – original town website
Forres Local – official town website
Visit Forres – official destination website
The Forres Gazette – local newspaper
Census data

Falconer Museum

 
Towns in Moray
Royal burghs
Enterprise areas of Scotland